Dunvilla is an unincorporated community in Otter Tail County, Minnesota, United States.

The community is located between Detroit Lakes and Barnesville on Minnesota State Highway 34.

Dunvilla is also located immediately north of Pelican Rapids on U.S. Route 59.

References

Unincorporated communities in Minnesota
Unincorporated communities in Otter Tail County, Minnesota